Bastard is a surname. Notable people with the surname include:

Bastard brothers John (–1770) and William (–1766), British surveyor-architects and civic dignitaries
Benjamin Bastard (died 1772), British architect
Charles Bastard (1863–1941), South Australian swimming instructor and baths lessee
Ebbo Bastard (1910–1949), South African international rugby union player
E. W. Bastard (1862–1901), Oxford University and Somerset cricketer
Edmund Bastard (politician) (1758–1816), British Tory politician
Edmund Pollexfen Bastard (1784–1838), British Tory politician
Gérald Bastard (born 1950), French physicist
John Bastard (Royal Navy officer) ( – 1835), Royal Navy officer and politician
John Bastard (cricketer) (1817–1848), Cambridge University and Marylebone Cricket Club cricketer
John Pollexfen Bastard (1756–1816), British Tory politician
Segar Bastard (1854–1921), English international footballer and referee
Thomas Bastard (1565/6-1618), English epigrammatist
Thomas Bastard (swimming) (died 1883), father of Charles Bastard
Pownoll Bastard Pellew, 2nd Viscount Exmouth (1786–1833), English peer and sailor